Dorothy Deming (1893–1972) was an American nurse and writer who wrote the 'Penny Marsh' books on public health nursing as a career.

Biography
Dorothy Deming was born in New Haven, Connecticut on 8 June 1893 to Clarence Deming and Mary Bryan Whiting. She was educated in Vassar College where she graduated with a Bachelor of Arts in 1914. She went on to attend Yale before graduating from the Presbyterian Hospital School of Nursing in New York in 1920. Deming was a student nurse during the flu epidemic of 1918. She also spent time studying at the Henry Street Visiting Nurse Association.

In 1924 Deming was the first director of the Holyoke Visiting Nurse association and went on to be the assistant to the director of the National Organization for Public Health Nursing in 1927 and then to the director of  Public Health Nursing from 1935 to 1942. Deming finished in the American Public Health Association from 1942 to 1952.

Deming wrote a series of books aimed at enticing girls into becoming nurses and her series were so successful that schools introduced clubs for fans. She also wrote on the history of nursing. Her best known series was based around 'Penny Marsh'.

Deming died in January 1972 in Winter Park, Florida.

Bibliography

 Sharon's nursing diary
 Anne Snow Mountain Nurse
 Penny Marsh, R.N.,: Director of nurses
 Hilda Baker,: School nurse
 Linda Kent,: Student nurse
 Nursing assignment in El Salvador
 The Practical Nurse
The Settlement of the Connecticut Towns
 Penny Marsh
 Penny Marsh, Supervisor of Public Health Nurses
 Penny Marsh Finds Adventure in Public Health Nursing
 Home Nursing
 Penny Marsh, public health nurse
 Sue Morris: Sky Nurse
 Penny and Pam: Nurse and Cadet

Sources

External links 
 

1893 births
1972 deaths
American nurses
People from New Haven, Connecticut
Vassar College alumni
20th-century American writers
20th-century American women writers